Virgin Galactic is a spaceflight company founded by Richard Branson and the Virgin Group conglomerate which retains an 11.9% stake through Virgin Investments Limited. It is headquartered in California, and operates from New Mexico. The company is developing commercial spacecraft and aims to provide suborbital spaceflights to space tourists. Virgin Galactic's suborbital spacecraft are air launched from beneath a carrier airplane known as White Knight Two. Virgin Galactic‘s maiden spaceflight occurred in 2018 with its VSS Unity spaceship. Branson had originally hoped to see a maiden spaceflight by 2010, but the date was delayed for several years, primarily due to the October 2014 crash of VSS Enterprise.

The company did the early work on the satellite launch development of LauncherOne before this was hived off to a separate company, Virgin Orbit, in 2017. The company also has aspirations for suborbital transport and in 2017, Branson has said that Virgin Galactic was "in the best position in the world" to provide rocket-powered, point-to-point  air travel.

In February 2019, the project carried three people, including a passenger, on VSS Unity VF-01, with a member of the team floating within the cabin during a spaceflight that reached .

On 11 July 2021, the company founder Richard Branson and three other employees rode on a flight as passengers, marking the first time a spaceflight company founder has travelled on his own ship into outer space (according to the NASA definition of outer space beginning at 50 miles above the Earth).

In February 2022, Virgin Galactic announced that it opens ticket sales to the public. The price of a reservation is $450,000. The company had sold tickets before February 2022 to clients that had paid deposits earlier or otherwise "were on a list"; as of November 2021 the company had about 700 customers (tickets sold). The company aims to have about 3 launches per month sometime in 2023.

A spin-off company, Virgin Orbit, uses the same launch approach to achieve orbital launch.

Structure and history

Formation and early activities 
Virgin Galactic was founded in 2004 by British entrepreneur Sir Richard Branson, who had previously founded the Virgin Group and the Virgin Atlantic airline, and who had a long personal history of balloon and surface record-breaking activities.
As part of Branson's promotion of the firm, he has added a variation of the Virgin Galactic livery to his personal business jet, the Dassault Falcon 900EX "Galactic girl" (G-GALX).

The Spaceship Company

The Spaceship Company (TSC) was founded by Richard Branson through Virgin Group (which owned 70%) and Burt Rutan through Scaled Composites (which owned 30%) to build commercial spaceships and launch aircraft for space travel. From the time of TSC's formation in 2005, the launch customer was Virgin Galactic, which contracted to purchase five SpaceShipTwos and two WhiteKnightTwos. Scaled Composites was contracted to develop and build the initial prototypes of WhiteKnightTwo and SpaceShipTwo, and then TSC began production of the follow-on vehicles beginning in 2008. In 2012, after Northrop Grumman acquired Scaled Composites, Virgin Galactic acquired the remaining 30% of The Spaceship Company.

Investors
In July 2011, Aabar invested a further  to develop a program to launch small satellites into low Earth orbit, raising their equity share to 37.8%. Virgin announced in June 2014 that they were in talks with Google about the injection of capital to fund both development and operations. The New Mexico government has invested approaching $200m (£121m) in the Spaceport America facility, for which Virgin Galactic is the anchor tenant; other commercial space companies also use the site.

On Monday 28 October 2019, Virgin Galactic listed into the New York Stock Exchange, trading under the ticker symbol 'SPCE', the first publicly traded space tourism company (i.e., company whose primary business is space tourism). The company raised $450 million through a SPAC merger listing, and company’s market value after listing was more than $2.4 billion. At the time, the company claimed to have over 600 customer reservations representing approximately $80 million in total collected deposits and more than $120 million in “potential revenue.”

Retail interest

After its listing, SPCE was a popular stock for many retail investors and was often mentioned on the subreddit r/wallstreetbets.

Aims

Overview of the flights to be developed
The spacecraft initially called SpaceShipTwo is planned to achieve a suborbital journey with a short period of weightlessness. Carried to about 16 kilometers, or 52,000 ft, underneath a carrier aircraft, White Knight II, after separation the vehicle would continue to over 100 km (the Kármán line, a common definition of where "space" begins). The time from liftoff of the White Knight booster carrying SpaceShipTwo until the touchdown of the spacecraft after the suborbital flight would be about 2.5 hours. The suborbital flight itself would be only a small fraction of that time, with weightlessness lasting approximately 6 minutes. Passengers will be able to release themselves from their seats during these six minutes and float around the cabin.

Development operations

2007 Scaled Composites fuel tank testing explosion
In July 2007, three Scaled Composites employees were killed and three critically injured at the Mojave spaceport while testing components of the rocket motor for SpaceShipTwo. An explosion occurred during a cold fire test, which involved nitrous oxide flowing through fuel injectors. The procedure had been expected to be safe.

Commencement of sub-space test flights
Just a year later, in July 2008, Richard Branson predicted the maiden space voyage would take place within 18 months. In October 2009, Virgin Galactic announced that initial flights would take place from Spaceport America "within two years." Later that year, Scaled Composites announced that White Knight Two's first SpaceShipTwo captive flights would be in early 2010.
Both aircraft did fly together in March 2010. The credibility of the earlier promises of launch dates by Virgin Galactic were brought into question in October 2014 by its chief executive, George Whitesides, when he told The Guardian: "We’ve changed dramatically as a company. When I joined in 2010 we were mostly a marketing organisation. Right now we can design, build, test, and fly a rocket motor all by ourselves and all in Mojave, which I don’t think is done anywhere else on the planet".

On 7 December 2009, SpaceShipTwo was unveiled at the Mojave Spaceport. Branson told the 300 people attending, each of whom had booked rides at $200,000 each, that flights would begin "in 2011." However, in April 2011, Branson announced further delays, saying "I hope 18 months from now, we’ll be sitting in our spaceship and heading off into space." By February 2012, SpaceShipTwo had completed 15 test flights attached to White Knight Two and an additional 16 glide tests, the last of which took place in September 2011. A rocket-powered test flight of SpaceShipTwo took place on 29 April 2013, with an engine burn of 16 seconds duration. The brief flight began at an altitude of 47,000 feet and reached a maximum altitude of 55,000 feet. While the SS2 achieved a speed of Mach 1.2 (920 mph), this was less than half the 2,000 mph speed predicted by Richard Branson. SpaceShipTwo's second supersonic flight achieved a speed of 1,100 mph for 20 seconds; while this was an improvement, it fell far short of the 2,500 mph for 70 seconds required to carry six passengers into space. However, Branson still announced his spaceship would be capable of "launching 100 satellites every day."

In addition to the suborbital passenger business, Virgin Galactic intended to market SpaceShipTwo for suborbital space science missions and market White Knight Two for "small satellite" launch services. It had planned to initiate RFPs for the satellite business in early 2010, but flights had not materialized as of 2014.

On 14 May 2013, Richard Branson stated on Virgin Radio Dubai's Kris Fade Morning Show that he would be aboard the first public flight of SpaceShipTwo, which had again been rescheduled, this time to December 25, 2013. "Maybe I’ll dress up as Father Christmas", Branson said. The third rocket-powered test flight of SpaceShipTwo took place on 10 January 2014 and successfully tested the spaceship's Reaction Control System (RCS) and the newly installed thermal protection coating on the vehicle's tail booms. Virgin Galactic CEO George Whitesides said "We are progressively closer to our target of starting commercial service in 2014". Interviewed by The Observer at the time of her 90th birthday in July 2014, Branson's mother, Eve, told reporter Elizabeth Day of her intention of going to space herself. Asked when that might be, she replied: "I think it’s the end of the year", adding after a pause, "It’s always 'the end of the year' ".

In February 2014, cracks in WhiteKnightTwo, where the spars connect with the fuselage, were discovered during an inspection conducted after Virgin Galactic took possession of the aircraft from builder Scaled Composites.

In September 2014, Richard Branson described the intended date for the first commercial flight as February or March 2015; by the time of this announcement, a new plastic-based fuel had yet to be ignited in-flight. By September 2014, the three test flights of the SS2 had only reached an altitude of around 71,000 ft, approximately 13 miles; in order to receive a Federal Aviation Administration licence to carry passengers, the craft needs to complete test missions at full speed and 62-mile height. Following the announcement of further delays, UK newspaper The Sunday Times reported that Branson faced a backlash from those who had booked flights with Virgin Galactic, with the company having received $80 million in fares and deposits. Tom Bower, author of Branson: The Man behind the Mask, told the Sunday Times: "They spent 10 years trying to perfect one engine and failed. They are now trying to use a different engine and get into space in six months. It's just not feasible." BBC science editor David Shukman commented in October 2014, that "[Branson's] enthusiasm and determination [are] undoubted. But his most recent promises of launching the first passenger trip by the end of this year had already started to look unrealistic some months ago."

VSS Enterprise crash

At 10:51 PST 31 October 2014, the fourth rocket-powered test flight of the company's first SpaceShipTwo craft, VSS Enterprise, ended in disaster, as it broke apart in mid-air, with the debris falling into the Mojave desert in California, shortly after being released from the mothership. Initial reports attributed the loss to an unidentified "in-flight anomaly". The flight was the first test of SpaceShipTwo with new plastic-based fuel, replacing the original—a rubber-based solid fuel that had not met expectations. 39-year-old co-pilot Michael Alsbury was killed and 43-year-old pilot Peter Siebold was seriously injured.

Investigation and media comment
Initial investigations found that the engine and propellant tanks were intact, showing that there had not been a fuel explosion. Telemetry data and cockpit video showed that instead, the air braking system appeared to have deployed incorrectly and too early, for unknown reasons, and that the craft had violently broken apart in mid-air seconds later.

U.S. National Transportation Safety Board Chairman Christopher Hart said on 2 November 2014 that investigators had determined SpaceShipTwo's tail system was supposed to have been released for deployment as the craft was traveling about 1.4 times the speed of sound; instead, the tail section began pivoting when the vehicle was flying at Mach 1. "I'm not stating that this is the cause of the mishap. We have months and months of investigation to determine what the cause was." Asked if pilot error was a possible factor, Hart said: "We are looking at all of these issues to determine what was the root cause of this mishap." He noted that it was also unclear how the tail mechanism began to rotate once it was unlocked, since that maneuver requires a separate pilot command that was never given, and whether the craft's position in the air and its speed somehow enabled the tail section to swing free on its own.

In November 2014, Branson and Virgin Galactic came under criticism for their attempts to distance the company from the disaster by referring to the test pilots as Scaled Composites employees. Virgin Galactic's official statement on 31 October 2014 said: “Virgin Galactic’s partner Scaled Composites conducted a powered test flight of SpaceShipTwo earlier today. [...] Local authorities have confirmed that one of the two Scaled Composites pilots died during the accident”. This was in strong contrast to public communications previously released concerning the group's successful flights, which had routinely presented pilots, craft, and projects within the same organizational structures, as being "Virgin Galactic" flights or activities of "the Galactic team". The BBC's David Shukman commented that: “Even as details emerge of what went wrong, this is clearly a massive setback to a company hoping to pioneer a new industry of space tourism. Confidence is everything and this will not encourage the long list of celebrity and millionaire customers waiting for their first flight".

At a hearing in Washington D.C. on 28 July 2015, and a press release on the same day the NTSB cited inadequate design safeguards, poor pilot training, lack of rigorous FAA oversight and a potentially anxious co-pilot without recent flight experience as important factors in the 2014 crash. They determined that the co-pilot, who died in the accident, prematurely unlocked a movable tail section some ten seconds after SpaceShip Two fired its rocket engine and was breaking the sound barrier, resulting in the craft's breaking apart. But the Board also found that the Scaled Composites unit of Northrop Grumman, which designed and flew the prototype space tourism vehicle, did not properly prepare for potential human slip-ups by providing a fail-safe system that could have guarded against such premature deployment. “A single-point human failure has to be anticipated,” board member Robert Sumwalt said. Instead, Scaled Composites “put all their eggs in the basket of the pilots doing it correctly.”

NTSB Chairman Christopher Hart emphasized that consideration of human factors, which was not emphasized in the design, safety assessment, and operation of SpaceShipTwo's feather system, is critical to safe human spaceflight to mitigate the potential consequences of human error. “Manned commercial spaceflight is a new frontier, with many unknown risks and hazards. In such an environment, safety margins around known hazards must be rigorously established and, where possible, expanded. For commercial spaceflight to successfully mature, we must meticulously seek out and mitigate known hazards, as a prerequisite to identifying and mitigating new hazards.” In its submission to the NTSB, Virgin Galactic reports that the second SS2, currently nearing completion, has been modified with an automatic mechanical inhibit device to prevent locking or unlocking of the feather during safety-critical phases. An explicit warning about the dangers of premature unlocking has also been added to the checklist and operating handbook, and a formalized crew resource management (CRM) approach, already used by Virgin for its WK2 operations, is being adopted for SS2. However, despite CRM issues being cited as a likely contributing cause, Virgin confirmed that it would not modify the cockpit display system.

While Virgin has been pursuing the development of a smallsat launch vehicle since 2012, the company began in 2015 to make the smallsat launch business a larger part of Virgin's core business plan, as the Virgin human spaceflight program has experienced multiple delays. This part of the business was spun off into a new company called Virgin Orbit in 2017.

VSS Unity 

Following the crash of VSS Enterprise, the replacement SpaceShipTwo named VSS Unity was rolled out on 19 February 2016. Test flights were set to begin after ground tests completed in August 2016. VSS Unity completed its first flight, a successful glide test, in December 2016. The glide lasted ten minutes. By January 2018, seven glide tests had been completed, and on 5 April 2018 it performed a powered test flight, the first since 2014. By July 2018, Unity had gone considerably higher and faster in its testing program than had its predecessor. On 13 December 2018, VSS Unity reached a height of 82.7 km (51.4 miles) above the Earth at speeds close to three times the speed of sound. The two pilots, Mark "Forger" Stucky and Frederick "CJ" Sturckow earned commercial astronaut wings from the US government for the accomplishment. Another flight in February 2019 carried third crew member (1 in the passenger cabin) for the first time.

After transfer to Spaceport America in New Mexico in February 2020, a couple of 15 km altitude test flights were carried out. Due to a surge in the number of Covid-19 cases in New Mexico, Virgin Galactic had to postpone a key test flight of its spacecraft in November 2020, and then in December 2020, a computer connection issue prevented engine ignition. On 22 May 2021, VSS flew its sixth powered test flight reaching an altitude of 89 km [55 mi]. This suborbital flight marked the first ever human space flight from New Mexico which was piloted by CJ Sturkow (pilot-in-command) and Dave MacKay. The VSS Unity was carried to 44,000' by the jet powered launch aircraft Mothership Eve, where it was released to reach its suborbital altitude over New Mexico. A test flight on 11 July 2021 fully crewed with two pilots Dave Mackay and Michael Masucci and the four passengers were Richard Branson, Beth Moses, Colin Bennett and Sirisha Bandla. The flight was initially claimed to be successful but it was later revealed Unity briefly stepped outside the airspace that had been reserved for it and the FAA were not informed as required. The FAA grounded Virgin Galactic's space planes before allowing a resumption of flights after some changes to procedures including reserving a larger volume of airspace.

On 14 October 2021, Virgin Galactic announced that an upgrade program for Unity and Eve would begin, delaying future commercial flights to mid 2022. This followed material analysis that required further analysis.

Spaceship III
The first Spaceship III, VSS Imagine, was rolled out on 30 March 2021 and it was indicated there is ground testing to do before glide test flights should commence not earlier than Summer 2021.

List of launches

Collaborations

Potential collaboration with NASA
In February 2007, Virgin announced that they had signed a memorandum of understanding with NASA to explore the potential for collaboration, but, to date, this has produced only a relatively small contract in 2011 of up to $4.5 million for research flights.

OneWeb satellite Internet access provider
Virgin Group in January 2015, announced an investment into the OneWeb satellite constellation providing world Internet access service of WorldVu. Virgin Galactic will take a share of the launch contracts to launch the satellites into their  orbits. The prospective launches would use the under-design LauncherOne system. In 2017 the LauncherOne business was spun off into Virgin Orbit.

Collaboration with Boom Technology
Virgin Galactic and the Virgin Group are collaborating with Boom Technology in order to create a new supersonic passenger transporter as a successor to the Concorde. This new supersonic plane would fly at Mach 2.2 (similar to Concorde) for a 3-hour trans-Atlantic flight (half of standard), projected to cost $2,500–10,000 per seat (half of Concorde) for a load of 45 passengers (the Concorde held 100). It is anticipated that with the accumulation of knowledge since the design of Concorde, the new plane would be safer and cheaper with better fuel economy, operating costs, and aerodynamics. Boom would collaborate with Virgin's The Spaceship Company for design, engineering, and flight-test support, and manufacturing.

The initial model would be the Boom Technology XB-1 "Baby Boom" Supersonic Demonstrator 1/3-size prototype. XB-1 would be equipped with General Electric J85 engines, Honeywell avionics, with composite structures fabricated by Blue Force using TenCate Advanced Composites carbon fibre products. First flight is scheduled for 2021.
Virgin Galactic has optioned 10 units.

Collaboration with Under Armour 
On 24 January 2019, Virgin Galactic announced a partnership with Under Armour for the fabrication of space suits for passengers and pilots of SpaceShipTwo. Under Armour will also create uniforms for Virgin Galactic employees working at Spaceport America. The full range known as the UA | VG (Under Armour | Virgin Galactic) built with UA's new Intelliknit fabric was revealed later this year, ahead of Richard Branson's inaugural commercial flight. This range includes a base layer, the space suit and footwear. It is said that the base layer will enhance performance and blood flow during the high and zero G portions of flight and the liner of the spacesuit is made up of new fabrics such as Tencel Luxe, SpinIt and Nomex, used for temperature control and moisture management.

Personnel and passengers

Key personnel
David Mackay, former RAF test pilot, was named chief pilot for Virgin Galactic in 2011 and chief test-pilot. Steve Isakowitz was appointed as Virgin Galactic's president in June 2013. In October 2016, Mike Moses replaced Steve Isakowitz as president; Isakowitz moved to Aerospace Corp. to become president and CEO; Moses was promoted from VP Operations, and was once a NASA flight director and shuttle integration manager.

Personnel
 Founder: Richard Branson
 Interim Chairman: Evan Lovell
 CEO: Michael Colglazier
 CFO: Doug Ahrens
 President - Safety: Mike Moses

Pilot corps
 Chief pilot: Dave "Mac" Mackay
 Chief flight instructor: Mike "Sooch" Masucci
 Test pilot: Kelly Latimer
 Pilot: Rick "CJ" Sturckow
 Pilot: Nicola Pecile
 Chief space flight participant instructor: Beth Moses

Aircraft and spacecraft

Motherships

White Knight Two

The White Knight Two is a special aeroplane built as the mother ship and launch-platform for the spacecraft SpaceShipTwo and the uncrewed launch vehicle LauncherOne. The mothership is a large fixed-wing aircraft with two hulls linked together by a central wing. Two aircraft are planned – VMS Eve and VMS Spirit of Steve Fossett. On May 22, 2021 Mothership Eve was used to carry VSS Unity to a launch altitude of 44,000 feet.

Boeing 747
The LauncherOne system will use a Boeing 747-400 aircraft, renamed Cosmic Girl, which was acquired from Virgin Atlantic. This was spun off into Virgin Orbit with the LauncherOne business in 2017.

Generation II mothership
Virgin Galactic plans to have generation 2 motherships ready for 2025, for the next-generation Delta-class spaceplanes. It partnered with Boeing's Aurora Flight Sciences to design and build the next generation of mothership.

Spaceships

SpaceShip Two

Richard Branson unveiled the rocket plane on 7 December 2009, announcing that, after testing, the plane would carry fare-paying passengers ticketed for short duration journeys just above the atmosphere. Virgin Group would initially launch from a base in New Mexico before extending operations around the globe. Built from lightweight carbon-composite materials and powered by a hybrid rocket motor, SS2 is based on the Ansari X Prize-winning SpaceShipOne concept – a rocket plane that is lifted initially by a carrier aircraft before independent launch. SS1 became the world's first private spaceship with a series of high-altitude flights in 2004.

The programme was delayed after three Scaled Composites employees – Todd Ivens, Eric Blackwell and Charles May – were killed in an accident in Mojave on 26 July 2007, where the detonation of a tank of nitrous oxide destroyed a test stand. They had been observing the test from behind a chain-link fence that offered no protection from the shrapnel and debris when the tank exploded. Three other employees were injured in the blast and the company was fined for breaches of health and safety rules. The cause of the accident has never been made public.

Its successor is twice as large, measuring 18 m (60 ft) in length; whereas SpaceShipOne could carry a single pilot and two passengers, SS2 will have a crew of two and room for six passengers. By August 2013, 640 customers had signed up for a flight, initially at a ticket price of $200,000 per person, but raised to $250,000 in May 2013. Tickets are available from more than 140 "space agents" worldwide.

SpaceShipTwo's projected performance

SpaceShipTwo was designed to fly to a height of 110 km, going beyond the defined boundary of space (100 km) and lengthening the experience of weightlessness for its passengers. The spacecraft would reach a top speed of 4000 km/h (2485 mph). On 23 May 2014, Virgin Galactic announced that they had abandoned use of the Sierra Nevada Corporation (SNC) nitrous-oxide-rubber motor for SpaceShipTwo; on 24 July 2014, SNC confirmed that they had also abandoned use of this motor for its Dream Chaser space shuttle. Future testing will see SpaceShipTwo powered by a polyamide grain powered motor. As of July 2021 the maximum height reached has been 89.9 km.

In honor of the science-fiction series Star Trek, the first ship was named after the fictional starship Enterprise. To reenter the atmosphere, SpaceShipTwo folds its wings up and then returns them to their original position for an unpowered descent flight back onto the runway. The craft has a very limited cross-range capability, and until other planned spaceports are built worldwide, it has to land in the area where it started. Further spaceports are planned in Abu Dhabi and elsewhere, with the intention that the spaceline will have a worldwide availability and commodity in the future.

There have been a series of delays to the SS2 flight test vehicle becoming operational, amidst repeated assurances from Virgin Galactic marketing that operational flights were only a year or two out. The Wall Street Journal reported in November 2014 that there has been "tension between Mr. Branson’s upbeat projections and the persistent hurdles that challenged the company’s hundreds of technical experts." The company has responded that "the company and its contractors 'have internal milestones, such as schedule estimates and goals, but the companies are driven by safety and the completion of the flight test program before moving into commercial service.' Virgin Galactic’s schedules have always been consistent with internal schedules of its contractors and changes have 'never impacted flight safety'."

SpaceShip Three

SpaceShipThree is an evolved version of SpaceShipTwo.

Delta-class spaceship
Virgin Galactic plans to have its third generation spaceship, the Delta class, ready for 2025, along with the next generation of mothership. The Delta class is to be functionally the same as the Space Ship III class, but it has been redesigned for higher production volumes.

Fleet

Commercial spaceflight locations
In 2008 it was announced that test launches for its fleet of two White Knight Two mother ships and five or more SpaceShipTwo tourist suborbital spacecraft would take place from the Mojave Spaceport, where Scaled Composites was constructing the spacecraft. An international architectural competition for the design of Virgin Galactic's operating base, Spaceport America in New Mexico, saw the contract awarded to URS and Foster + Partners architects. In the same year Virgin Galactic announced that it would eventually operate in Europe out of Spaceport Sweden or even from RAF Lossiemouth in Scotland.

While the original plan called for flight operations to transfer from the California desert to the new spaceport upon completion of the spaceport, Virgin Galactic has yet to complete the development and test program of SpaceShipTwo. In October 2010, the 3,000 m (10,000 ft) runway at Spaceport America was opened, with SpaceShipTwo "VSS Enterprise" shipped to the site carried underneath the fuselage of Virgin Galactic's Mother Ship Eve.

Other operations and aspirations

LauncherOne

LauncherOne is an orbital launch vehicle that Virgin Galactic had begun working on by late 2008, with the technical specifications defined in some detail in late 2009.
The LauncherOne configuration was proposed to be an expendable, two-stage, liquid-fueled rocket, envisaged to be air-launched from a White Knight Two. This would make it a similar configuration to that used by Orbital Sciences' Pegasus, or a smaller version of the StratoLaunch.

LauncherOne was publicly announced in July 2012. It was intended to launch "smallsat" payloads of  into Earth orbit. Several commercial customers initially contracted for launches, including GeoOptics, Skybox Imaging, Spaceflight Services, and Planetary Resources. Both Surrey Satellite Technology and Sierra Nevada Space Systems began developing satellite buses "optimized to the design of LauncherOne".

In 2015, Virgin Galactic established a  research, development, and manufacturing center for LauncherOne at the Long Beach Airport.
The company reported in March 2015 that they were on schedule to begin test flights of LauncherOne with its Newton 3 engine by the end of 2016. On 25 June 2015, the company signed a contract with OneWeb Ltd. for 39 satellite launches for its satellite constellation with an option for an additional 100 launches.

In March 2017, Virgin Galactic spun off its 200-member LauncherOne team into a new company called Virgin Orbit.

Point to point suborbital travel

In 2016 TSC, Virgin Galactic and the Virgin Group began a collaboration with Boom Technology to develop a supersonic trans-oceanic passenger jetliner. A mission concept review of a Mach 3 vehicle design was carried out.

Competition
Virgin Galactic is not the only corporation pursuing suborbital spacecraft for tourism. Blue Origin is developing suborbital flights with its New Shepard spacecraft. Although initially more secretive about its plans, Jeff Bezos company has developed a spacecraft that takes off and lands vertically and can carry four people to the edge of space. New Shepard first flew above the Karman line and landed in 2015 and the same vehicle was reflown to above the Karman line again in 2016. On 20 July 2021, they flew the first paying customer.

On 16 September 2014, SpaceX and Boeing were awarded contracts as part of NASA's CCtCap program to develop their Crew Dragon and CST-100 Starliner spacecraft, respectively. Both are capsule designs to bring crew to orbit, a different commercial market than that addressed by Virgin Galactic.

Now-defunct XCOR Aerospace had also worked on rocket-powered aircraft during many of the years that Virgin Galactic had; XCOR's Lynx suborbital vehicle was under development for more than a decade, and its predecessor, the XCOR EZ-Rocket experimental rocket powered airplane did actually take flight, but the company closed its doors in 2017.

Notable accomplishments

First launch of founder into space 

This suborbital flight was accomplished using the twin-fuselage aircraft launch platform VMS Eve, coupled together with VSS Unity, enabling Branson, three other employee passengers and the two pilots to experience approximately three minutes of weightlessness above Earth’s atmosphere. The entire flight lasted approximately one hour, taking off and landing at Spaceport America facility near Truth or Consequences, New Mexico.

This flight had originally been scheduled to occur later in the summer; however, shortly after the announcement of competitor Blue Origin's plans to fly Amazon founder Jeff Bezos into space on 20 July 2021, the Virgin Galactic flight was rescheduled to occur on 11 July 2021. Virgin Galactic has been certified by the FAA to provide commercial spaceflight travel, and its accounts report that over 600 commercial passengers have already signed up. The August 2021 price is US$450,000 per person. Virgin Galactic planned to begin commercial spaceflight service in 2022; however, the company has yet to fly a commercial spaceflight as of March 4, 2023.

See also
Virgin Orbit 
Dennis Tito
List of crewed spacecraft
New Mexico Spaceport Authority
NewSpace
X Prize Foundation
Billionaire space race

Notes

References

External links

 
 

 The Spaceship Company
 Virgin Galactic’s SpaceShipTwo Mothership Makes Maiden Flight
 Virgin Galactic:Let the Journey Begin (Video)
 Branson And Rutan Launch New Spaceship Manufacturing Company
 U.S. Okays Virgin Galactic Spaceship Plans
 New Mexico Spaceport Bills Signed
 Lloyds Eyes Covering Virgin Spaceflights
 Virgin Galactic Rolls Out Mothership "Eve“
 Episode 38: January 23rd 2011: Want to be an Astronaut? Book a ticket online
 Failure to launch? Spaceport America takes a couple of hits 

 
Companies listed on the New York Stock Exchange
2017 initial public offerings
Aerospace companies of the United States
Private spaceflight companies
Commercial spaceflight
Human spaceflight programs
Space tourism
Technology companies based in Greater Los Angeles
Companies based in Long Beach, California
Airlines established in 2004
Technology companies established in 2004
2004 establishments in California
Aabar Investments
G
2019 mergers and acquisitions
Special-purpose acquisition companies
American companies established in 2004